Stormed Fortress is volume eight of the Wars of Light and Shadow by Janny Wurts. It is also volume five of the Alliance of Light, the third story arc in the Wars of Light and Shadow.

Stormed Fortress is the concluding volume to the Alliance of Light, the third story arc of the Wars of Light and Shadow.

Publication
This novel is currently available in the UK, Australia and New Zealand. US publication date has been set for Fall 2009.

Synopsis
Though Athera may be free, the fight is far from over…

The heartstopping conclusion to the Alliance of Light series brings Lysaer's army of Light to besiege the great citadel of Alestron. Master of Shadow, Arithon, with barely a moment's recuperation from his victory over the necromancers, has discovered that young Jeynsa s'Valerient whom he has sworn to protect, has joined the ranks of his disowned allies within the threatened citadel. Worse, following a failed rescue attempt, his beloved Elaira, his double, Fionn Areth, and the spellbinder Dakar are also trapped within Alestron's walls. The chancy wiles of Davien the betrayer must spirit Arithon across the enemy lines to attempt a bold and perilous rescue mission.

Arithon must seek the heartcore of his talent, even while embroiled in a savage battle against those he has vowed to protect. But treachery strikes from deep within the duke's ranks. Lysaer's fanatics will be unleashed to claim their bloody revenge. With the Fellowship Sorcerers in mortal danger, and all under threat from a collapsing grimward, Davien the betrayer is unable to intercede to save his colleagues and so will be forced to invoke the dire terms of an ancient and most secretive bargain.

Arithon stands alone at the hour of reckoning as the true purpose of the Koriani enchantresses becomes, at long last, fully unveiled – with the covetous Prime Matriarch now poised to snatch a prize, a prize beyond that of merely integrity and life…

External links
Stormed Fortress at Janny Wurts' official site
Excerpt from Stormed Fortress

American fantasy novels
Wars of Light and Shadow
Alliance of Light
2007 American novels